Gorgich (also Romanized as Gorgīch; also known as Gorgej Umār, Gorg-e Ūmār, Gorgīj, Gūrgīj, and Korakī Jān) is a village in Negur Rural District, Dashtiari District, Chabahar County, Sistan and Baluchestan Province, Iran. At the 2006 census, its population was 479, in 80 families.

References 

Populated places in Chabahar County